The Yuen Yuen Institute is a Taoist temple in Lo Wai, Tsuen Wan District, Hong Kong.

Location
The Institute is located on hectares of land around Sam Dip Tam, Tsuen Wan District in the New Territories. The area is interspersed with temples, pavilions, and monasteries.

History
The Yuen Yuen Institute was established in Hong Kong in 1950 by monks from Sanyuan Gong (Three Originals Palace) in Guangzhou, which in turn traces its lineage to the Longmen (Dragon Gate) Lineage of Quanzhen (Complete Perfection) Taoism.

The Yuen Yuen Institute is the only temple in Hong Kong dedicated to all three major Chinese religions: Taoism, Buddhism and Confucianism. The first three Chinese characters of the Institute's name denote the essence of Buddhism, Taoism and Confucianism respectively, so as to advocate the integration and realization of the three religions' teachings.

The main building at the Institute is a replica of the Temple of Heaven (Tian Tan) in Beijing. In 1968, Moy Lin-shin co-founded (together with Taoist Masters Mui Ming-to and Mrs Tang Yuen Mei) the temple for the Fung Loy Kok Institute of Taoism on the grounds of the Yuen Yuen Institute.

Purpose
The Institute's purpose is:
to spread the principles of the three religions, Taoism, Buddhism and Confucianism;
to uphold the eight virtues (i.e. filial piety, respect, loyalty, fidelity, propriety, justice, honesty and honour);
to promote social welfare.

Activities
During the annual Lantern Festival, donations are exchanged for lanterns in the belief that these will bring fortune and health. The proceeds go to maintaining the Old Age Home and the hospitals and schools run by the Yuen Yuen Institute.
An annual Bonsai and Stone Appreciation Show.
A restaurant is maintained at the Institute that offers vegetarian food.
Celebration of Chinese New Year or Ghost Month (the 7th month of the lunar calendar).

References

External links
 Institute website

Taoist temples in Hong Kong
Tsuen Wan District
Three teachings